Zheleznovodsk is a town in Stavropol Krai, Russia. Population:

Etymology
The name of the town literally means iron-water-place, as the mineral waters springing from the earth in Zheleznovodsk were believed to have high content of iron.

Geography
Zheleznovodsk is situated in the saddle between Mounts Beshtau and Zheleznaya, in what the locals refer to as aerodynamic tube, which attracts strong winds in the winter.

History
During World War II, the town was occupied by the German Army from 10 August 1942 until 12 January 1943.

Zheleznovodsk was the place of signing the Zheleznovodsk Communiqué by Boris Yeltsin, Nursultan Nazarbayev, Ayaz Mutallibov, Levon Ter-Petrosyan on September 23, 1991.

Administrative and municipal status
Within the framework of administrative divisions, it is, together with the settlement of Inozemtsevo, incorporated as the town of krai significance of Zheleznovodsk—an administrative unit with the status equal to that of the districts. As a municipal division, the town of krai significance of Zheleznovodsk is incorporated as Zheleznovodsk Urban Okrug.

Economy
Zheleznovodsk, along with Pyatigorsk, Yessentuki, Kislovodsk, and Mineralnye Vody, is a part of the Caucasus Mineral Waters, a renowned Russian spa resort. The town economy revolves around sanatoria, where dozens of thousands of people from all over Russia and former Soviet republics come year-around to vacation and rest, as well as prevent and treat stomach, kidney, and liver diseases. Dozens of spas operate in Russia's Caucasus Mountains region, exploiting the mineral springs in the area; colonic treatment is a specialty.

Miscellaneous

Over the past several years, Zheleznovodsk was the site of the International Hot Air Balloon Festival.

Notable people
In 1841, Mikhail Lermontov, famous Russian poet, spent the last day of his life in Zheleznovodsk, from where he departed to his fatal duel on the slopes of Mount Mashuk in Pyatigorsk.
Native Julia Sakharova won the top prize in the International Competition for Music of Eastern and Central Europe, at the age of fifteen.

References

Notes

Sources

External links

Official website of Zheleznovodsk 
Zheleznovodsk Business Directory 

1810 establishments in the Russian Empire
Cities and towns in Stavropol Krai
Populated places established in 1810
Spa towns in Russia